The 1980 Giro d'Italia was the 63rd edition of the Giro d'Italia, one of cycling's Grand Tours. The Giro began in Genoa, with a prologue individual time trial on 15 May, and Stage 12 occurred on 28 May with a stage from Villapiana Lido. The race finished in Milan on 7 June.

Stage 12
28 May 1980 — Villapiana Lido to Campi Salentina,

Stage 13
29 May 1980 — Campi Salentina to Barletta,

Stage 14
30 May 1980 — Foggia to Roccaraso,

Stage 15
31 May 1980 — Roccaraso to Teramo,

Stage 16
1 June 1980 — Giulianova to Gatteo a Mare,

Stage 17
2 June 1980 — Gatteo a Mare to Sirmione,

Stage 18
3 June 1980 — Sirmione to Zoldo Alto,

Stage 19
4 June 1980 — Longarone to Cles,

Stage 20
5 June 1980 — Cles to Sondrio,

Stage 21
6 June 1980 — Saronno to Turbigo,  (ITT)

Stage 22
7 June 1980 — Milan to Milan,

References

1980 Giro d'Italia
Giro d'Italia stages